Mihailovca may refer to several places in Moldova:

Mihailovca, Cimişlia, a commune in Cimişlia district
Mihailovca, Transnistria, a commune in Transnistria
Mihailovca, a village in Prajila Commune, Floreşti district
Mihailovca, a village in Prepeliţa Commune, Sîngerei district